The Journal of Shanghai University (Natural Science, English Edition) is a journal of opinion and research in the fields of the science. The journal is published quarterly by Shanghai University. Its editor-in-chief is Huang Hung-chia.

External links 
 

Publications with year of establishment missing
Academic journals published by universities and colleges